Keith Powell (born August 12, 1979) is an American television actor, writer, director, and web series creator, known for his role as James "Toofer" Spurlock on 30 Rock, and for creating and starring in the web series Keith Broke His Leg, for which he won several Indie Series Awards in 2016.

Early life and education 
Born in Philadelphia, Pennsylvania, Powell later moved to California before graduating from St. Mark's High School in Wilmington, Delaware. Powell then earned a Bachelor of Fine Arts from New York University's Tisch School of the Arts in 2001.

Career
Powell was the Producing Artistic Director of Contemporary Stage Company, a summer theater in Wilmington, Delaware. His producing credits include New York productions of The Mouse That Roared, Enter Pissarro, Indra & Agni Collide and a workshop of Kidding Jane with Ellen McLaughlin and William Charles Mitchell. Powell was the resident director for Equalogy, a professional touring company promoting social change, for which he directed two plays by August Schulenberg, Four Hearts Changing and One Night.

His other directing credits include Dutchman, Quality of Silence, The Visit and Enter Pissarro. As an actor, Powell has appeared in numerous national network commercials. His theatre credits include Romeo & Juliet (The Shakespeare Theatre, Washington, D.C.), Kidding Jane (Portland Stage Company), Macbeth (Pittsburgh Public Theater), As Bees in Honey Drown (Hangar Theater, Ithaca, New York), and The French (HB Playwrights Foundation, NYC) among others.

In the spring of 2007, while working as a recurring character on 30 Rock, he shot an ABC pilot called Judy's Got A Gun. It was not picked up for the Fall 2007 season, and Powell returned to 30 Rock, where he was promoted to a series regular. In October 2008, Powell launched and starred in a self-funded web series called Keith Powell Directs a Play (co-written and directed by Patrick Flynn), chronicling Powell's foray into directing Uncle Vanya at a fictional repertory theatre group. In 2009, Powell was a guest commentator on VH1's 100 Greatest One Hit Wonders of the 80s, and also played a Tuskegee Airman in Night at the Museum: Battle of the Smithsonian.

In 2014, Powell began a recurring role on the television series About a Boy as Richard, Will's workaholic friend, accountant, and business manager.

Powell recurred on the final season of The Newsroom. He appeared in the feature film My Name Is David. In 2015, he created, wrote, directed, and starred in the web series Keith Broke His Leg. The series went on to win several Indie Series Awards, including Best Comedy Series and Best Actor in a Comedy.

Powell began his television directing career in March 2018 with the season three episode "Amnesty" of the NBC television series Superstore. He has since directed episodes of Dickinson, Single Drunk Female, Interview with the Vampire, and So Help Me Todd.

Personal life
In October 2013, Powell married visual artist Jill Knox. In 2019, Powell and Knox announced the birth of their first child, a daughter. In 2021, they had a second child, a boy. Powell and Knox live in Los Angeles.

Filmography

Film

Television

References

External links
Official Keith Powell website

A Chat with Keith Powell of 30 Rock
Interview with Keith Powell
Duncan Sheik Will Conjure Ghosts in New Musical, an article including Powell

1979 births
Living people
Male actors from Delaware
Male actors from Philadelphia
African-American male actors
American male film actors
American male television actors
Tisch School of the Arts alumni
People from Wilmington, Delaware
Date of birth missing (living people)
21st-century American male actors